Hoy te vi is a Venezuelan telenovela that was produced by Radio Caracas Televisión in 1998 based on a story written by Basilio Álvarez and Laura Bottome. The telenovela was a youthful production focusing on adolescents and their concerns. This telenovela lasted 122 episodes and was distributed internationally by RCTV International.

Plot
Nicolás, Iván, Ricardo, Napoleón and Gerardo are five teenagers searching for a dream that will change their lives forever. They form part of a musical band called Máximo Nivel, and this musical group is responsible for giving life to this story full adventures, love, joys and teenage madness.

The main protagonist of this youthful history is the music, on which the whole plot revolves, around music these five boys are building their dreams of being famous, challenging their families, contributing a noble cause or enjoying the Moment until life allows. Together with these five young people there are always five women who accompany them and give them their love and support and together they overcome all barriers and obstacles that make it difficult to reach their goal, sometimes suffering the consequences of disappointments until they discover That many times money is not the most important thing, but, on the contrary, good people always get better things than money .

Everyone struggles desperately to achieve success and fame, but the family's dismay, pain and interference will try to stop them, but finally with the help of an old friend who trusts them and will help them keep their secret safe they will get it. Which they have longed for so long. The incredible connection between all the young friends creates a wonderful bond of love , risk and adventure. From success to the failure of fame and its unexpected consequences, this is a story that speaks of passion , friendship, communication and improvement, but more than anything else is a story that talks about how to grow.

Cast
Sandy Olivares as Nicolas Pereira Gómez
Chantal Baudaux as Jessica Linares Urdaneta
Alejandro Loynaz as Luis Guillermo Villanueva (Luis G.)
Luis La Rosa as Ricardo Pereira Gómez 
Concetta Lo Dolce as Andrea D'Ascoli Borsari [de Cuevas]
Nacho Huett as Iván José Pereira Gómez
Ámbar Díaz as Josefina 'Fefi' Serrano
Ramón Castro as Napoleón Serrano
Mirela Mendoza as Liliana Mungarrieta Henríquez
Hernan Diaz as Gerardo Arrieta
Natalia Romero as Teresa del Carmen 'Teresita' Robles
Damian Genovese as Jorge Cuevas Miquelarena 
Betzabeth Duque as Tibisay Luna
Joel Borges as Daniel 'Danny' Ríos Vizcarrondo 
Manuel Díquez as himself
Jeronimo Gil as John William 'Johnny' Fuentes
Luis Daniel Gómez as Esteban
Hernán Mejía as Caliche
Iván Tamayo as Augusto Linares Zavaleta
Rebeca Costoya as Catalina Urdaneta de Linares
Ernesto Balzi as Ivan Jose Pereira
Flor Elena González as Eva Gomez de Pereira
Miguel Alcántara as Atanasio Arrieta
María Cristina Lozada as Eusebia Robles y Palomar
Alejo Felipe as Benito Castro Carras (Sr. Casca)
Héctor Campobello as Mario D'Ascoli
José Félix Cárdenas as Dr. Dumpiérrez
Jaime Urribarri as Christian
Andy Rodríguez as Jose 'Cheíto' Pereira Gómez
Yorman González as Antonio 'Toñito' D'Ascoli Borsari
Karen Pita as Ninoska Linares Urdaneta
Andreina De Sousa as Karina Linares Urdaneta
Gisvel Ascanio as Isabella Gutierrez
Eduardo Gadea Pérez as Grandfather Iván José Pereira (spirit) 
Sheyene Gerardi as Perla

References

External links
Hoy te Vi at the Internet Movie Database
Opening Credits

1998 telenovelas
RCTV telenovelas
Venezuelan telenovelas
1998 Venezuelan television series debuts
1998 Venezuelan television series endings
Spanish-language telenovelas
Television series about teenagers
Television shows set in Venezuela